The Ayrshire Tornadoes are a Scottish basketball club based in Dalry, North Ayrshire.

History
The club was founded in 1991 as Troon Basketball Club, playing home games at Marr College, Troon.  As one of Scotland's leading amateur basketball clubs, the club joined the Scottish Men's National League for the 1998–99 season as the Troon Tornadoes, quickly establishing themselves as a very capable National League team. Their first title came 4 years later, winning the Scottish National League in 2002, with only a single defeat all season.

The Tornadoes would finish in the top-3 teams for 5 of the next 6 seasons, including another National League title in 2006. During this period the Tornadoes also claimed the Scottish Cup title on three occasions. From 2008 onwards, the club remained competitive in the National League albeit in a slow and steady decline down the league standings.

In 2015, the club moved from their traditional home in Troon to Dalry, and rebranded as the Ayrshire Tornadoes to reflect the wide area across which the club attracted players and hoped to develop a wider community programme. Unfortunately these plans did not stop the decline of the senior men's team, who after finishing 10th in Division 1, were relegated into the newly formed Division 2. The Tornadoes spent three seasons in Division 2, eventually achieving promotion back to Division 1 in 2019.

Teams
Senior Men (National League Division 1)
Senior Men B (Strathclyde League Division 2)
U18 Men (National League Division 1)
U16 Men (National League Division 1)

Honours
Scottish National League Champions (2002, 2006)
Scottish Cup Champions (2003, 2005, 2006)

Professional players
In the summer of 2006, several players formed part of a mass exodus towards professional basketball clubs including, Dan Wardrope (to Guildford Heat), Brian McCotter (to Newcastle Eagles), and Andy Pearson (to Scottish Rocks).

Season-by-season records

References

External links
Official Facebook Page

Basketball teams in Scotland
1991 establishments in Scotland
Sport in North Ayrshire
Sport in South Ayrshire
Troon
Dalry, North Ayrshire
Basketball teams established in 1991